Shanell Lynn Woodgett (born November 15, 1982) known simply as Shanell or SnL, is an American singer and songwriter from Atlanta, Georgia. She is signed to Lil Wayne's Young Money Entertainment, which was formerly an imprint of Birdman's Republic Records-distributed Cash Money Records.

Biography
Born in Anaheim, California Shanell was raised in Atlanta, Georgia and is the older sister of recording artist D. Woods. Her introduction to music was from her father, a Merrill Lynch Financial Advisor. A classically trained dancer in the disciplines of Jazz, ballet and modern dance, she began her career as a music video dancer for artists like Ciara. Dancing by day, Shanell penned songs by night to production from Iowa producer and friend Bangladesh, garnering a name for herself as a songwriter.

As a principal dancer for Ne-Yo, who later signed her to his publishing company, Shanell headed out on tour where she continued to record and hone her writing skills, penning songs for Danity Kane, Ne-Yo, Melanie Fiona, Kelis and Jennifer Hudson. She was introduced to Lil Wayne, who offered her a slot on his Young Money Entertainment roster, creative control of her projects, and the opportunity to join him on stage during his I Am Music Tour. Shanell was also on the 40-city I Am Music II Tour with Lil Boo, Lloyd, Kidd Kidd, Kevin Kev and Big Dawg Movement which started in Hartford, CT July 13, 2011 and ended in Woodlands, TX September 11, 2011.

Most recently, Shanell released a visual for "Boy Stop Playin'" in January 2014, which was included on her June 2013 EP Midnight Mimosas.

Discography

Compilation albums

Mixtapes

Singles

As lead artist

As featured artist

Guest appearances

References

External links
 
 Shanell Artist Information

1984 births
American choreographers
American dance musicians
American electro musicians
American female dancers
American dancers
Cash Money Records artists
Living people
Musicians from Anaheim, California
Songwriters from California
Young Money Entertainment artists
21st-century American singers
Singers from Massachusetts
Songwriters from Massachusetts
American women in electronic music
21st-century American women